Iván Fenyő (born 15 June 1979) is a Hungarian actor.

He made his studies at the University of Drama, Film and Television, Budapest.

Fenyő made his feature film debut as an American Marine in Jarhead, directed by Sam Mendes. Although most of his scenes were cut from the movie, he went on to play the lead in the Hungarian films Kútfejek, Children of Glory, S.O.S. Szerelem! and 9 és fél randi. He has a minor role in Magyar Szépség directed by Péter Gothár.

His long-time girlfriend was actress Adél Jordán. Fenyő lives in Budapest.

References

External links
 
 

1979 births
Living people
Hungarian male film actors